Vasily Smirnov may refer to:

Vasily Smirnov (writer) (1904/1905–1979), Soviet writer
Vasily Dmitriyevich Smirnov (1846–1922), Russian orientalist
Vasily Sergeyevich Smirnov (metallurgist) (1914–1973), Soviet metallurgist
Vasily Sergeyevich Smirnov (painter) (1858–1890), Russian painter 
Vasily Pavlovich Smirnov (1908–1987), Russian footballer
Vasily Smirnov (serial killer) (1947–1980), Soviet serial killer, rapist, cannibal, brigand, robber and arsonist

See also
 Smirnov (surname)
 Smirnoff (surname)